The Royal Irish Academy of Music (RIAM) in Dublin, Ireland, is one of Europe's oldest music conservatoires, specialising in classical music and the Irish harp. It is located in a Georgian building on Westland Row in Dublin. An institution which offers tuition from age 4 up to doctorate level, the RIAM has taught music performers and composers who have gone on to acclaim on the world stage. It is an associate college of the University of Dublin, Trinity College.

History
The RIAM was founded in 1848 by a group of music enthusiasts including John Stanford (father of Charles Villiers Stanford), Richard Michael Levey, and Joseph Robinson. It was originally located in the former Antient Concert Rooms on Pearse Street, then at 18 St Stephens Green, and moved to its present address in 36 Westland Row in 1871. The following year it was granted the right to use the title "Royal". Its teaching staff includes many international and national prizewinners, members of the National Symphony Orchestra of Ireland and the RTÉ Concert Orchestra and many individuals whose names have become synonymous with music education in Ireland.

The RIAM is a unique institution in the Irish context and doesn't follow the typical European conservatoire model. Since its foundation, it has developed to become a place of relevance and inspiration for musicians, reaching to over 50,000 each year. In the course of its history, the RIAM has led the music education of over 1,000,000 musicians in Ireland.

During the COVID-19 pandemic in Ireland, the RIAM cancelled its spring and summer examinations in line with the 12 March decision by the government to close schools and universities. In April, the RIAM announced that it was implementing an online system for exams. In response to social distancing measures, the RIAM also organised live stream performances and developed instructional content for its YouTube channel.

Local Centre Examination System
The RIAM's Local Centre Examination System (LCES), founded in 1894, is Ireland's only indigenous examining body for music. The LCES caters for 42,000 students in 1,700 centres in every county across the island of Ireland. Over 7,000 private music teachers enter their students for these exams, and the RIAM has developed a portfolio of teacher training programmes aimed at this market. November 2013 saw the launch of the RIAM Teaching Network, Ireland's first virtual learning environment aimed at continuing education for the instrumental and vocal teacher. By utilising the skills of its core faculty to teach and advise the RIAM Teaching Network, the institution is committed to consolidating its position as "the champion and enabler of the private music teaching profession".

Part-time tuition
The RIAM has 1,500 part-time students who are assessed annually and make up some of the pool of students who apply for RIAM's full-time courses. Recent initiatives such as junior chamber music and junior improvisation courses have sought to offer such students (and outside students) the opportunity to develop a more rounded musical education. In 2016, the RIAM launched the "Young Scholar Programme" to support the development of the especially committed school-age children, through international exchanges, masterclasses and mentoring.

Full-time study
As an associate college of Trinity College, the University of Dublin, all RIAM degrees (at bachelor, master's and doctorate level) are awarded by Trinity College, and students have access to the facilities of this institution. 150 full-time students study at the RIAM and also act as cultural ambassadors for the RIAM and for Ireland, forging good professional careers and participating in international concerts and competitions. This student body is made of representatives from over 17 countries. These full-time programmes are focused on classical music performance, composition and education, and have been running for a quarter of a century. Graduates of the RIAM's full-time programmes have been accepted for further study at the most prestigious music institutions around the world from the Juilliard School in New York to the Royal Academy of Music in London. In recent years students of the Academy have been finalists and winners of some of the world's most prestigious international competitions including the Clara Haskil International Piano Competition, the Cardiff Singer of the World Competition, the China International Vocal Competition, the Cologne International Piano Competition, the Dublin International Piano Competition and the BBC Musician of the Year. On the international stage, former students are currently members of such leading orchestras as the London Symphony Orchestra, the Philharmonia Orchestra, Hong Kong Philharmonic Orchestra, as well as opera houses from the Royal Opera House at Covent Garden to La Scala, Milan.

The Cathal Gannon Early Music Room was opened in May 2003; it contains a harpsichord and clavichord made by Cathal Gannon, a Broadwood grand piano restored by him, a square piano and information about Mr Gannon in addition to other historically significant keyboard instruments. In 2016, the RIAM founded Ireland's first Historical Performance Department in collaboration with foundation partners, the Irish Baroque Orchestra.

Philanthropy and financial aid
At least 10% of the RIAM's tuition income is reinvested in financial aid programmes for students. This allows young students from any socio-economic background to access a quality music education. At bachelor, master and doctorate level, tuition waivers are also made available, on the understanding that the scholarship recipients (known as "1848 Scholars") will give back to the institution by assisting faculty or joining its outreach projects in Dublin city and beyond.

Special collections
The RIAM library holds a number of collections of historical interest, originally privately collected or belonging to orchestral and choral societies active in Dublin in the 18th and 19th centuries. Most notably, they include:

 The collections of the Sons of Handel and the Antient Concerts Society, who maintained a continuous choral tradition from 1790 to 1863 that was at the centre of musical life in Dublin.
 The collection of the Anacreontic Society (Ireland), an orchestral society active in Dublin from 1740 to 1865.
 The Hudleston Collection of solo and chamber music for guitar, collected by Josiah Andrew Hudleston (1799–1865) and which features around 1,100 works by Giuliani, Sor, Carulli and many others, in original and contemporary editions.
 The Joan Trimble Collection.

Notable alumni
Notable former students and alumni of the Royal Irish Academy of Music include:
Tara Blaise – pop and folk singer
Seóirse Bodley – composer
Moya Brennan – folk singer, songwriter and harpist
Jessie Buckley – singer and actress
John Buckley – composer
Mairead Buicke – opera singer
Anthony Byrne – pianist
Celine Byrne – soprano
Karan Casey – folk singer
Finghin Collins – pianist
Annie Jessy Curwen – writer and pianist
Donnacha Dennehy - composer
Denis Donoghue – literary critic
Ellen Duncan – Irish art gallery director and critic.
Tara Erraught - mezzo-soprano
Frank Ll. Harrison – organist, composer and musicologist
Ethel Hobday – pianist
Frederick May – composer
Ailbhe McDonagh - cellist and composer
Frank McNamara – conductor, composer, and pianist
Tara McNeill – singer, violinist, harpist
Havelock Nelson – composer and conductor
Betty Ann Norton – acting teacher
Vincent O'Brien – organist, choir director and composer
John O'Conor – pianist
J.J. Sheridan - pianist and music historian
Fionnuala Sweeney – journalist and broadcaster
John Millington Synge – playwright and poet
Joan Trimble – composer and pianist
Ailish Tynan – soprano
Gráinne Yeats – harpist and singer

Notable teachers
Notable teachers at the Royal Irish Academy of Music (past and present) include:

 John S. Beckett – composer and conductor
 Walter Beckett – composer
 Brian Boydell – composer, broadcaster and writer
 Maeve Broderick – violinist
 Anthony Byrne – pianist
 Luigi Caracciolo – singer
 James Cavanagh – trumpet and conductor
 Lance Coburn – pianist
 Dearbhla Collins – pianist
 Dina Copeman – pianist
 William Dowdall – flautist
 Aisling Drury Byrne – cellist
 Veronica Dunne – opera singer
 Wilhelm Elsner – cellist 
 Michele Esposito – composer and pianist
Therese Fahy - Pianist 
 Pamela Flanagan – pianist and cellist
 Anthony Glavin – poet
 Octave Grisard – violinist
 George Hewson – organist
 Anthony Hughes – pianist
 Fionnuala Hunt – violinist
 Brenda Hurley – repetiteur/vocal coach
 Thomas Richard Gonsalvez Jozé – organist, conductor, composer
 Doris Keogh – flute
 Virginia Kerr – opera singer

 John Francis Larchet – composer
 Madeleine Larchet née Moore – violinist
 Richard Michael Levey – violinist
 Annie Lord – pianist
 Rhona Marshall née Clark – pianist
 Christopher Marwood – cellist
 Ailbhe McDonagh - cellist and composer
 Dennis Noble – baritone
 John O'Conor – pianist
 Terry O'Connor – violinist
 Richard O'Donnell – percussionist
 Margaret O'Hea – pianist
 Guido Papini – violinist
 A. J. Potter – composer
 Joseph Robinson – composer and singer
 Marek Ruszczynski – repetiteur/vocal coach
 Elizabeth Scott-Fennell – singer
 Helmut Seeber – oboist
 Achille Simonetti – violinist and composer
 Robert Prescott Stewart – composer, organist, conductor
 Hugh Tinney – pianist
 Carmel Turner – pianist
 Clyde Twelvetrees – cellist
 Adelio Viani – singer
 Adolph Wilhelmj – violinist
 James Wilson – composer
 Sean Cahill - trombonist

References

Richard Pine & Charles Acton (eds.): To Talent Alone. The Royal Irish Academy of Music 1848-1998 (Dublin: Gill & Macmillan, 1998), .

External links
 http://www.riam.ie
 https://web.archive.org/web/20131206203505/http://www.ahss.tcd.ie/associated-colleges.php
Youtube channel of the RIAM

1848 establishments in Ireland
Classical music in Ireland
Educational institutions established in 1848
Music schools in the Republic of Ireland
Seanad nominating bodies
Trinity College Dublin